Charles Akin Embry (August 17, 1901 – October 10, 1947), was a Major League Baseball pitcher who played in  with the Chicago White Sox. He batted and threw right-handed. Slim played baseball for the Vanderbilt Commodores from 1921 to 1923.  The Commodores were champions of the Southern Intercollegiate Athletic Association in 1921, and Slim was captain of the team in 1923. He was also a member of the basketball team in 1921–1922 and 1922–1923. Embry graduated from Vanderbilt with a degree in law in 1923.

Early years
Charles Akin Embry was born on August 17, 1901 in Columbia, Tennessee to Wiley Bridges Embry and Alma Williamson. Embry attended Central High School in Nashville, Tennessee.

College baseball

Embry was a prominent member of Vanderbilt Commodores baseball teams which won a 1921 SIAA title. Embry was considered the team's best pitcher, posting a record of 9–3.

College basketball
Slim was a center on the Vanderbilt Commodores basketball team. Vanderbilt's yearbook The Commodore in 1922 mentions "This elongated individual of diamond fame played spasmodically at the tip-off role, occasionally displaying brilliant passing and accurate shooting, and at other times warranting the remark "As a basketball player, Slim Embry's an All-American pitcher."

Later years
Embry died of tuberculosis on October 10, 1947 in Belle Meade, Tennessee.

References

External links

1901 births
1947 deaths
Major League Baseball pitchers
Baseball players from Tennessee
People from Columbia, Tennessee
Chicago White Sox players
Vanderbilt Commodores baseball players
Centers (basketball)